UTS Central, also known as Building 2, is the building housing the Faculty of Law and UTS Library at the University of Technology Sydney. It is the final building to be opened under the A$1 billion City Campus Master Plan. The building is designed by Francis-Jones Morehen Thorp (FJMT), with elements of an original podium design by Lacoste+Stevenson in association with DJRD. Construction was overseen by head contractor Richard Crookes Constructions. The building is located next to the UTS Tower in Ultimo. It opened in August 2019.

Design
The building is located next to the UTS tower and opposite Central Park in Broadway. The state-of-the-art glass-encased UTS Central is made up of a striking dual design, with a 10-level twisted tower sitting above a 5-level podium and two underground floors. The UTS Central design is notable for its elegant, curved lines, which provide a complementary contrast to the modular, utilitarian design of the Brutalist UTS Tower. UTS Central is linked directly with the UTS Tower through pedestrian links on levels 3–6.

Double helix staircase 
An intertwining double helix staircase made from Australian steel and curved glass connects levels 4 to 7. The double ribbon spiral design originated with architects FJMT and is inspired by the double helix structure of a DNA molecule, a reminder of how breakthroughs in science and technology have transformed our world. The double helix is one of four ‘architectural’ stairways in the building. All of the helical staircases in the UTS Central building, including the double helix, were designed in collaboration with Active Metal, a leading Australian stair designer and manufacturer.

Glass facade 

Key features

UTS Library 
The UTS Library relocated from Building 5 to UTS Central in November 2019. The relocation allows the UTS Library to be directly connected to the library retrieval system (LRS) located below the Alumni Green. The UTS Library spans over three levels and is connected to the UTS Reading Room with views out towards Alumni Green and two outdoor terraces.

UTS Reading Room 
The design of the UTS Reading Room was inspired by traditional scholarly spaces where academics engage with current research, exchange ideas and immerse themselves in study. With a triple-height atrium opening to a large skylight and an uninterrupted glass façade overlooking Alumni Green, this is a light-filled space for quiet work, reading and contemplation.

Hive Superlab 

Located below ground on level 1, the Hive Superlab can accommodate up to 270 students and contains specialist audio-visual facilities (including bone conduction headphones) that allow seven classes to run simultaneously.

Large collaborative classrooms 

Three world-leading large collaborative classrooms incorporate innovative design features that support collaborative learning and teaching at scale. Designed in consultation with academics, the classrooms have no obvious ‘front’ of the room.  Multiple presenter spaces and adaptable furniture enhance opportunities for active student participation. The two largest classrooms hold up to 350 students, while a third accommodates 198 students.

Faculty of Law 
The upper levels of UTS Central will be home to the Faculty of Law. It will accommodate offices for the Law faculty, student areas and centres including AntiSlavery Australia and the UTS-UNSW Australasian Legal Information Institute. A moot court and two trial courts with modern technologies found in Australian courts will be available for law students.

Public food court 
A large food court is located on level 3 with 440 seats and eight food outlets.

Sustainability
The building is targeting a 5 star Green Star rating from the Green Building Council of Australia. UTS Central has been developed with many sustainability features including;

Intelligent sensors connected to the building management system adjust heating, cooling and ventilation based on the amount of occupants in the building
Recycled water used for toilet flushing and irrigation of the building's landscaping
Adjustable louvre blinds which are connected to the building management system control the amount of sunlight hitting the glass facade
Chilled water supplied from the nearby Central Park provides cooling for the air-conditioning at UTS Central and other buildings

Gallery

See also
 Buildings and architecture of Sydney
 University of Technology Sydney

References

Buildings and structures in Sydney
University of Technology Sydney
University and college buildings in Australia
Buildings and structures completed in 2019